Workflowers is a brand developed for media services, including consulting and training. The first company using the Workflowers brand was founded by Cedric Lejeune in 2006 that specialized in services for digital cinema and post-production. Workflowers helped companies all around the world to organize for better workflows, 
Workflowers also developed image processing plugins for Autodesk Lustre and an online collaborative platform called CrUB. During the research works on this platform Workflowers joined the Mediamap+ Special Interest Group.

History
Workflowers was founded in 2006 by Cedric Lejeune. He was part of the installation of the first digital cinema production line at Laboratoires Éclair in 2002. The company then served as a DI workflow and color science consultant for high-end post-production providers such as Autodesk Media and Entertainment, Sony, Technicolor New-York, EFILM Australia, Cinelab, Lupe Postproducciones, Colorfront, and Digital Pictures.

In 2020 the brand was rebooted and added to its workflow and infrastructure services a new service developed to help media companies reduce their carbon footprint and energy consumption. The new company is based in Valence, Drôme, France and provides services internationally. "
Workflowers won the SATIS 2021 Environmental Initiative prize  and was finalist of the Next Innov innovation in 2022 https://www.prixnextinnov.com/les-finalistes-2022

Autodesk Lustre plug-ins
Workflowers developed its wf_x plug-ins for the high-end color grading software Lustre. The plug-ins add features to Autodesk Lustre software like compositing (wf_comp) or blend modes. Wf_bw plug-in was a special request from colorist Charlotte Mazzinghi and cinematographer Pierre Gill to develop the specific look of Polytechnique. Other colorists like Sebastian Göhs, who worked on Waltz with Bashir, and Martin Greer are also users of those plug-ins.
The BW and Grain plugins were used on the "Paperman" Disney short that was color graded by Kent Pritchett and won the Best Animated Short Film at the 85th Academy Awards. https://www.youtube.com/watch?v=XrqSF2OOz_M  https://en.wikipedia.org/wiki/Paperman

References

External links
 Official website

Film and video technology
Technology companies established in 2006
French companies established in 2006
Companies based in Auvergne-Rhône-Alpes